Anomoeotes nigrivenosus is a species of moth of the Anomoeotidae family. It is known from the Democratic Republic of the Congo and South Africa.

References

Anomoeotidae
Insects of the Democratic Republic of the Congo
Moths of Africa
Moths described in 1893